My People's Market is a series of temporary marketplaces in Portland, Oregon, focusing on businesses owned by people of color.

History
The first event was held in 2017. It was founded by Amanda Park, Tamara Kennedy-Hill, Michelle Comer, and Tory Campbell, and hosted by Prosper Portland and Travel Oregon. The 2019 event was sponsored by New Seasons Market. The 2020 event was "re-imagined" because of the COVID-19 pandemic. Santé Bar hosted the market's beer garden in 2021.

References

External links

 

2017 establishments in Oregon
Culture of Portland, Oregon
Economy of Portland, Oregon
Events in Portland, Oregon
Recurring events established in 2017